This is a list of place names in the United States that either are Dutch, were translated from Dutch, or were heavily inspired by a Dutch name or term. Many originate from the Dutch colony of New Netherland.

California
 Delft Colony, California

Colorado
 Leyden, Colorado
 Nederland, Colorado

Georgia
 Amsterdam, Georgia

Illinois
 Leyden Township, Cook County, Illinois
 South Holland, Illinois

Indiana
 Holland, Indiana

Iowa
 Breda, Iowa

Kentucky
 Ghent, Kentucky

Louisiana
 Zwolle, Louisiana

Massachusetts
 Leyden, Massachusetts
 Middleborough, Massachusetts

Michigan
 Antwerp Township, Michigan
 Borculo, Michigan
 Drenthe, Michigan
 Holland, Michigan
 Noordeloos, Michigan
 Overisel Township, Michigan
 Vriesland, Michigan
 Zeeland, Michigan

Minnesota
 Delft, Minnesota
 Ghent, Minnesota
 Groningen, Minnesota
 Holland, Minnesota
 Hollandale, Minnesota
 Holland Township, Kandiyohi County, Minnesota

Missouri
 Amsterdam, Missouri
 Deventer, Missouri

Montana
 Amsterdam, Montana

New Jersey
 Amsterdam, New Jersey
 Arthur Kill
 Barnegat: Barnegat Bay, Barnegat Branch Trail, Barnegat Inlet, Barnegat Light, New Jersey, Barnegat Lighthouse State Park, Barnegat Peninsula, Barnegat Township, New Jersey, Barnegat (CDP), New Jersey
 Bergen: Bergen County, New Jersey, Bergen Hill, Bergen Hill, Neighborhood in Jersey City,  Bergen Neck peninsula, Bergen Point,  Bergen Square, Neighborhood in Jersey City, Bergenfield, New Jersey, Bergenline Avenue, North Bergen, New Jersey
 Bloomingdale, New Jersey
 Brielle, New Jersey
 Constable Hook
 Cromakill Creek
 Cresskill, New Jersey
 Deep Voll Brook
 Dwars Kill
  Cromakill Creek and Cromakill Marsh
 Frelinghuysen Township, New Jersey
 Harlingen, New Jersey
 Hasbrouck Heights, New Jersey
 Hoboken, New Jersey
 Holland Township, New Jersey
 Houvenkopf Mountain
 Kill van Kull
 Holland, Monmouth County, New Jersey
  Losen Slote Creek
  Molly Ann Brook (originally Molly's Yawn Brook)
 Overpeck Creek
 Paulins Kill
 Paulus Hook, Neighborhood in Jersey City
 Pavonia Terminal, Jersey City, New Jersey
  Robbins Reef
 Rutgers University
 Sparkill Creek
 Sandy Hook
 Skillman, New Jersey
 Teaneck, New Jersey
 Tenafly, New Jersey
 Van Vorst Park, Neighborhood in Jersey City
 Walkill River
 Wyckoff, New Jersey

New York
 Alplaus Kill
 Alplaus, New York
 Amsterdam (city), New York
 Amsterdam (town), New York
 Anthony Kill
 Arbor Hill Historic District–Ten Broeck Triangle
 Arthur Kill*
 Barneveld, New York
 Batavia Kill
 Batavia Kill (East Branch Delaware River)
 Batavia, New York
 Batavia (town), New York
 Batten Kill
 Bear Kill
 Beaver Kill
 Beaver Kill (Alder Creek)
 Beaverkill Creek
 Bedford–Stuyvesant, Brooklyn
 Beekman Place
 Beekman, New York
 Beeren Island
 Bergen (village), New York
 Bergen Street (IND Culver Line)
 Bergen Street (IRT Eastern Parkway Line)
 Bergen, New York
 Blauvelt, New York
 Bleecker Street
 Boerum Hill
 Boght Corners, New York
 Bowery
Bozen Kill
 Brinckerhoff, New York
 Bronx River
 The Bronx
 Brooklyn
 Bush Kill
 Bush Kill (Pepacton Reservoir tributary)
 Bushwick, Brooklyn
 Casperkill
 Catskill (town), New York
 Catskill Creek
 Catskill Mountains
 Claverack Creek
 Claverack, New York
 Cobleskill Creek
 Cobleskill (town), New York
 Coeymans, New York
 Collect Pond
 Colonie, New York
 Compaanen Kill
 Coney Island
 Cortelyou Road (BMT Brighton Line)
 Cortland County, New York
 Cortland, New York
 Cortlandt Manor, New York
 Cortlandt, New York
 Cortlandville, New York
 Cottekill, New York
 Danskammer Generating Station
 Defreestville, New York
 Delphus Kill
 DeRuyter, New York
 DeRuyter (village), New York
 Desbrosses Street (IRT Ninth Avenue Line)
 Dunderberg Mountain
 Dwaarkill, New York
 Dwaar Kill (Shawangunk Kill tributary)
 Dyker Heights, Brooklyn
 East Flatbush, Brooklyn
 East Fishkill, New York
 East Greenbush, New York
 East Kill
 East Nassau, New York
 East River
 Evas Kill
 Fall Kill
 Fishers Island, New York
 Fishkill Creek
 Fishkill, New York
 Flatbush, Brooklyn
 Flushing, Queens
 Fonteyn Kill
 Fort Crailo
 Franklinton Vlaie
 Fresh Kills
 Gansevoort, New York
 Gerritsen Beach, Brooklyn
 Gerritsen Creek
 Ghent, New York
 Gowanus, Brooklyn
 Gramercy Park
 Gravesend, Brooklyn
 Great Vlaie
 Greenburgh, New York
 Green Island, New York
 Greenwich Village
 Guilderland, New York
 Halfmoon, New York
 Harlem
 Haverstraw, New York
 Helderberg Escarpment
 Hell Gate
 Hempstead (village), New York
 Holland, New York
 Hoyt–Schermerhorn Streets (New York City Subway)
 Jan De Bakkers Kill
 Kaaterskill Creek
 Kaaterskill Falls
 Katsbaan, New York
 Kaikout Kill
 Keyser Kill
 Kill Van Kull
 Kinderhook (town), New York
 Kinderhook (village), New York
 Kips Bay, Manhattan
 Krum Kill
 Kykuit
 Leyden, New York
 Liberty Island
 Lincklaen, New York
 Lisha Kill, New York
 Lisha Kill
 Little Red Kill
 Little Shawangunk Kill
 Long Island
 Louse Kill
 Maiden Lane (Manhattan)
 Manor of Rensselaerswyck
 Maritje Kill
 Midwood, Brooklyn
 Mine Kill
 Moccasin Kill
 Moodna Creek
 Moordener Kill
 Muddy Kill
 Muitzes Kill
 Muitzes Kill Historic District
 Nassau (town), New York
 Nassau (village), New York
 Nassau County, New York
 Nassau Street (Manhattan)
 New Dorp, Staten Island
 New Utrecht, Brooklyn
 Normans Kill
 North Greenbush, New York
 North River (Hudson River)
 Nostrand Avenue
 Old Town, Staten Island
 Orange County, New York
 Orangetown, New York
 Otter Kill
 Ox Kill
 Oyster Bay (hamlet), New York
 Oyster Bay (town), New York
 Paerdegat Basin
 Peekskill, New York
 Plattekill (town), New York
 Platte Kill
 Plotter Kill (Mohawk River)
 Plotter Kill Preserve
 Poestenkill (CDP), New York
 Poestenkill, New York
 Pollepel Island
 Port of Albany–Rensselaer
 Prospect Lefferts Gardens
 Punch Kill
 Quackenkill, New York
 Quacken Kill
 Red Hook (village), New York
 Red Hook, Brooklyn
 Red Hook, New York
 Red Kill
 Remsen Village, Brooklyn
 Rensselaer County
 Rensselaer, New York
 Rensselaerville, New York
 Rhinebeck (town), New York
 Rhinebeck (village), New York
 Rikers Island
 Rip Van Winkle Bridge
 Roaring Kill
 Roeliff Jansen Kill
 Rondout, New York
 Roosevelt Island
 Rotterdam (town), New York
 St. Mark's Church in-the-Bowery
 Sandsea Kill
 Saugerties, New York
 Saw Kill
 Sawyer Kill
 Schermerhorn Row Block
 Schuyler County, New York
 Schuyler Mansion
 Shawangunk Kill
 Shawangunk, New York
 Shawangunk Ridge
 Spackenkill, New York
 Sparkill Creek
 Speigletown, New York
 Spuyten Duyvil Bridge
 Spuyten Duyvil Creek
 Spuyten Duyvil, Bronx
 Staatsburg, New York
 Staten Island
 Stuyvesant Street
 Swartekill, New York
 Switz Kill
 Tappan Zee Bridge
 Ten Broeck Mansion
 Todt Hill
 Tremper Kill
 Valatie, New York
 Martin Van Buren National Historic Site
 Van Buren, New York
 Van Cortlandt Village
 Van Nest, Bronx
 Van Pelt Manor
 Verplanck, New York
 Verf Kill
 Verkeerder Kill
 Verkeerder Kill Falls
 Vloman Kill
 Vly Mountain
 Voorheesville, New York
 Wall Street
 Wallabout Bay
 Wallabout, Brooklyn
 Wallkill, New York
 Wallkill River
 Watervliet, New York
 West Kill
 West Kill (North Blenheim, Schoharie Creek)
 Wyckoff Heights, New York
 Wynantskill, New York
 Wynants Kill
 Yonkers, New York

North Dakota
 Hague, North Dakota

Ohio
 Amsterdam, Ohio
 Antwerp, Ohio
 Ghent, Ohio
 New Holland, Ohio

Pennsylvania
 Amsterdam, Pennsylvania
 Bushkill, Pennsylvania

Rhode Island
 Rhode Island
 Block Island

South Dakota
 New Holland, South Dakota

Texas
 Amsterdam, Texas
 Harlingen, Texas
 Nederland, Texas

Vermont
 Holland, Vermont

Virginia
 Amsterdam, Virginia
  Ghent Neighborhood in Norfolk, Virginia

West Virginia
 Ghent, West Virginia

Wisconsin
 Barneveld, Wisconsin
 Friesland, Wisconsin
 Holland, La Crosse County, Wisconsin
 Hollandtown, Wisconsin
 Leyden, Wisconsin
 Oostburg, Wisconsin

See also
 List of New Netherland placename etymologies
 List of non-US places that have a US place named after them

Dutch
Dutch language in the United States
Dutch origin